Shannon Barnett (born 1982) is an Australian trombonist and composer who was named Young Australian Jazz Artist of the Year at the 2007 Australian Jazz Bell Awards.

Background
Barnett was born in Traralgon. Since completing studies at the Victorian College of the Arts, she has performed in ensembles including Vada, The Bamboos, The Black Arm Band, The Vampires, the Bennetts Lane Big Band and as a guest with the Andrea Keller Quartet, on the 2004 ABC Jazz release Angels and Rascals.

Barnett has also appeared with the Australian Art Orchestra, Barney McAll’s Mother of Dreams and Secrets feat. Kurt Rosenwinkel, Charlie Haden, Flap! and the Paul Grabowsky Sextet.

From 2009 to 2010, Barnett worked as a multi-instrumentalist and composer with the contemporary circus group Circus Oz, as part of the Barely Contained season

In 2011, Barnett relocated to New York City, to pursue a Master of Music degree.
 

They released their debut album Hype in 2017.

In 2018. she composed and presented the cross-disciplinary work 'Dead Weight' for musicians and fitness studio. Her new project 'Wolves and Mirrors' will release their first album in early 2021.

In April 2019. she began as Professor for Jazz Trombone at the Hochschule für Musik und Tanz in Cologne, Germany.  In 2020, she received the WDR Jazzpreis for Improvisation.

Releases
In 2010, Barnett released her debut album as a leader, entitled Country on the Which Way Music label. The recording also features Christopher Hale (acoustic bass guitar), Nashua Lee (electric guitar) and Ben Hendry (drums), and was nominated for Best Jazz Album in the 2010 AIR Awards and Best Jazz Recording in the 2011 ABC Limelight Awards

In 2011, Barnett relocated to New York City, to pursue a Master of Music degree. Whilst there, she performed with the likes of Darcy James Argue's Secret Society, Ralph Alessi's SIM Big Band and Jon Faddis.

References

External links

Australian jazz trombonists
Women jazz musicians
Living people
1982 births
People from Traralgon
21st-century women musicians
21st-century trombonists
People educated at Blackburn High School
Women trombonists
Musicians from Victoria (Australia)